The 2012 Rochester Rhinos season will be the club's seventeenth season of existence. It is the Rhinos' second-consecutive year in the third tier of American soccer, playing in the USL Professional Division for their second season.

Background 
After the split of several USL clubs to create the North American Soccer League, United Soccer Leagues restructured its top division, and created the USL Pro, which received third-tier sanctioning from U.S. Soccer. The Rhinos, who had played in the second division of American soccer for their entire existence, opted to join the USL Pro, and thus play in the third tier.

On the field, the Rhinos won their division, and boasted the fourth best overall record, making it the second straight year Rochester were division champions. For the third straight season, however, Rochester was eliminated in the first round of the respective league's playoffs.

Outside of the USL Pro Division, the Rhinos were eliminated in the third round of the 2012 U.S. Open Cup by the MLS side Philadelphia Union. The Rhinos also played a School Day friendly against NPSL team FC Buffalo.

Competitions

Preseason Friendlies

USL Pro

Standings

Results summary 

Results by round

USL Pro Play Off

U.S. Open Cup

Statistics

Appearances and goals

Top scorers

Disciplinary record

Roster
as of November 28, 2011

See also 
 2012 in American soccer
 2012 USL Pro season
 Richmond Kickers

References 

2012 USL Pro season
Rochester New York FC seasons
American soccer clubs 2012 season
2012 in sports in New York (state)